Murdoch is a suburb of Perth, Western Australia, located within the City of Melville. Murdoch University, St John of God Hospital Murdoch and Fiona Stanley Hospital are located in Murdoch. The suburb is named after Sir Walter Murdoch, the great uncle of international media proprietor Rupert Murdoch, who is the current chairman of both Fox Corporation and News Corp.

Location
Murdoch is located next to Winthrop, Bateman, Kardinya and North Lake. Boundaries with these suburbs are delineated by Somerville Drive, Murdoch Drive, Prescott Drive and Farrington Road respectively.

Land use
Murdoch's residential area is primarily on the northern side of South Street; the area on the southern side is primarily for commercial usage. While hospitals and educational institutions dominate the suburb's land usage, the area also includes a police station, a fire station, and the minimum-security Wandoo Rehabilitation Prison.

Hospitals
There are two major hospital complexes within Murdoch: the privately owned St John of God Hospital and the Government-operated Fiona Stanley Hospital that opened in October 2014.

Education
Tertiary education institutions Murdoch University and a campus of the South Metropolitan TAFE are located in Murdoch. Kennedy Baptist College caters for students from year 7 to 12. There are no primary schools within the suburb.

Transport
Murdoch Park 'n' Ride is located in Murdoch, and incorporates Murdoch Station. Major bus routes include the CircleRoute, running along South Street; route 183 servicing Murdoch Park 'n' Ride; and route 185 servicing Murdoch University.

Churches
There are several churches based in the suburb of Murdoch, including Evangel Christian Fellowship; an evangelical church based in Murdoch University since 1991.

References

External links

 
Suburbs of Perth, Western Australia
Suburbs in the City of Melville